Felicia bergeriana is a richly branching, hairy annual plant of up to  high that is assigned to the family Asteraceae. It is sometimes called kingfisher daisy in English. It can be found in the Northern and Western Cape provinces of South Africa. It is sometimes cultivated as an ornamental.

Description 
Its stems are covered in perpendicular bristles and glands.

The involucre is up to  cm ( in) in diameter and consists of 2 whorls of bracts. These encircle more numerous, yellow disc florets of up to 2 mm (0.1 in) long, those next to the ray florets bisexual and those in the center male. Surrounding the base of the corolla are about ten, quickly discarded, white, protruding bristly pappus bristles of about 1–2 mm (0.06–0.10 in) long. The cypselae of the innermost disc florets are hairless.

Taxonomy 
The kingfisher daisy was first described by Kurt Polycarp Joachim Sprengel in 1826, based on a specimen that had been collected by Christian Friedrich Ecklon on the Montis Dorsi Leonis (probably Signal Hill, near Cape Town), and he called it Cineraria bergeriana. In 1832, Christian Friedrich Lessing reassigned the species to the genus Elphegea, making the combination Elphegea bergeriana. One year later, followed by Nees von Esenbeck, who called it Detridium bergerianum. In 1836, Augustin Pyramus de Candolle again reassigned it, making the combination Agathaea bergeriana. William Henry Harvey, who merged several genera into Aster, created the name A. bergerianum in 1865.  Harry Bolus and Anthony Hurt Wolley-Dod in 1950 assign the species to the genus Felicia, creating the combination Felicia bergeriana. Jürke Grau in his 1973 Revision of the genus Felicia (Asteraceae), considered all these names synonymous, but making a spelling error, quoting F. bergerana.

Distribution and conservation 
The kingfisher daisy can be found thinly scattered between Namaqualand in the north to the Cape Peninsula in the south. The continued survival of Felicia bergeriana is considered to be of least concern because its population is stable.

References

External links 
 Photos of Felicia bergeriana on iNaturalist
 Line drawing of Felicia bergeriana
 Distribution of Felicia bergeriana

bergeriana